Madame Bovary is a 1937 German historical drama film directed by Gerhard Lamprecht and starring Pola Negri, Aribert Wäscher and Ferdinand Marian. It is an adaptation of Gustave Flaubert's 1857 novel Madame Bovary. It was shot at the Babelsberg Studios in Potsdam. The film's sets were designed by the art director Otto Moldenhauer.

Plot summary

Cast

References

Bibliography

External links 
 
 
 

1937 films
Films of Nazi Germany
German historical drama films
German black-and-white films
Films about infidelity
1930s historical drama films
1930s German-language films
Films directed by Gerhard Lamprecht
Films set in France
Films set in the 19th century
Films based on Madame Bovary
Terra Film films
1937 drama films
1930s German films
Films shot at Babelsberg Studios